Brendon Gibb (born 9 October 1988) is an Australian Rugby league Player for the Brisbane Broncos in the NRL.
He made his NRL debut in Round 14, 2012.
He played at the Gladstone brothers at his junior club and found his favoured position in the back row.
In 2012 he was named in the Queensland Residents side.

References

1988 births
Living people
Brisbane Broncos players
Windsor Wolves players
Rugby league centres
Norths Devils players
Rugby league second-rows
Wynnum Manly Seagulls players
Australian rugby league players
Rugby league players from Gladstone, Queensland